Philosophy is an oil-on-canvas self-portrait of Salvator Rosa, the Italian Baroque artist who is best known for his imaginary landscapes. The painting is usually interpreted as a personification of philosophy.

The painting measures . The artist has depicted himself in this three-quarter length portrait wearing a black scholar's cap over his long and untidy hair, against a stormy grey sky.  The viewpoint is below the sitter, who looks down at the viewer with a sombre expression. The right side of his unshaven face is heavily shadowed, emphasising his long narrow nose. His left hand holds his gown closed, with the collar of a white shirt appearing at the neck, and the right hand holds a plaque which bears the Latin inscription AVT TACE / AVT LOQVERE MELIORA / SILENTIO, which may be translated "Be quiet, unless your speech be better than silence" or "Either keep quiet, or say something better than silence". The Latin is taken from the Anthologia of Stobaeus, a collection of quotations from Ancient Greek authors published in the 5th century AD. Rosa wished to increase his artistic reputation by becoming known as a painter of philosophical subjects, rather than the landscapes which were less valued in the hierarchy of genres. Rosa published his own anthology of sayings, Il Teatro della Politica, in 1669; this included entries on the virtue of silence.

Rosa made the painting around 1645 for Filippo Niccolini, who was among his circle of friends in Florence and had served as tutor and then as chamberlain to Rosa's patron Giovanni Carlo de' Medici. Though the work was long thought to be a self-portrait due to an inscription on the reverse of the painting, recent scholarship has suggested that it was intended as a personification of philosophy.  It may have been intended as a pendant painting to his 1640 painting Poetry, now held in the Wadsworth Atheneum, which depicts Rosa's female companion Lucrezia as a personification of Poetry with a similar size and composition against a similarly plain background. That work was also owned by the Niccolini family in Florence until it was sold to Rev. John Sanford (1777–1855) in the 1830s. It later entered the collection of the Marquis of Lansdowne at Bowood House, where it remained until 1955 (when most of the dilapidated house was demolished); it was sold to the Wadsworth Atheneum in 1956.

Philosophy was presented to the National Gallery in 1933, by Henry Petty-Fitzmaurice, 6th Marquess of Lansdowne, in memory of his father, the 5th Marquess, who had died in 1927.

References

 Philosophy, Salvator Rosa, National Gallery, London
 Philosophy, Salvator Rosa (1615–1673), Art UK
 Salvator Rosa, Self portrait, ca. 1645, RKD
 Lucrezia as Poetry, Wadsworth Atheneum 
 Lucrezia as Poetry, Renaissance to Rococo: Masterpieces from the Wadsworth Atheneum Museum of Art, Yale University Press, 2004, pp. 72–73

Self-portraits
Paintings by Salvator Rosa
Collections of the National Gallery, London
1640s paintings